Maryhill High School is a catholic founded Girls’ O & A-level Boarding school located at Nyamitanga hill in Mbarara District in the Western Region of Uganda. The school is affiliated with the Roman Catholic Diocese of Mbarara. It was started in 1961 with the aim of promoting the education of the girl child to build the nation.

Location
It is located on Nyamitanga Hill, about 2.5 Kilometres from Mbarara town along Mbarara-Kabale Highway.

Notable alumni
Emma Boona, teacher, public administrator and politician
Leah Kagasa, model and beauty pageant contestant
Kasha Nabagesera, LGBT rights activist
Polly Namaye,  communications professional, educator and policewoman

References

External links
"Maryhill High School students tipped on living successful lives"
"About Maryhill High School"
"Museveni opens Maryhill golden Jubilee complex"
"Top 10 schools in last 10 years "

Boarding schools in Uganda
Educational institutions established in 1961
1961 establishments in Uganda
Girls' schools in Uganda
Mbarara District
Kumusha